Martin Zafirov (Bulgarian: Мартин Зафиров; born 26 December 1973 in Bulgaria) is a Bulgarian retired footballer.

References

1973 births
Bulgarian footballers
Living people
PFC CSKA Sofia players
Hamburger SV players
PFC Spartak Varna players
FC Lokomotiv 1929 Sofia players
PFC Lokomotiv Plovdiv players
Association football forwards